Yapo Kader N'Chobi (born 17 November 1995) is an Ivorian professional footballer who plays as a forward for Laval.

Career
Born in the Ivory Coast, N'Chobi moved to France at a young age and was a member of the youth academies of CFFP Orly, Paris Saint-Germain, Boulogne-Billancourt, Valenciennes, Red Star and Nantes. After being released by Nantes, he began his senior career with the semi-pro club Oissel in the Championnat National 3. He moved to Mantois in 2016, where he made 9 appearances without scoring. He started finding his form with Rouen in 2018, earning him a transfer to Cholet in the summer of 2020. He transferred to Laval on 3 June 2021, signing a 2+1 year contract. He helped Laval win the 2021–22 Championnat National, earning promotion to the Ligue 2 for the 2022-23 season.

Honours
Laval
Championnat National: 2021–22

References

External links
 

1995 births
Living people
People from Bingerville
Ivorian footballers
CMS Oissel players
FC Mantois 78 players
FC Rouen players
SO Cholet players
Stade Lavallois players
Ligue 2 players
Championnat National players
Championnat National 2 players
Championnat National 3 players
Association football forwards
Ivorian expatriate footballers
Ivorian expatriates in France
Expatriate footballers in France